The 1954–55 Montreal Canadiens season was the Canadiens' 46th season of play. The Canadiens finished in second place in the National Hockey League (NHL) with a record of 41 wins, 18 losses, and 11 ties for 93 points. In the playoffs, they defeated the Boston Bruins in five games in the semi-finals before falling to the Detroit Red Wings in seven games in the Stanley Cup Finals.

This season was notable for the suspension of Maurice "Rocket" Richard, Montreal's star player, by NHL president Clarence Campbell after a vicious fight with Boston defenceman Hal Laycoe and Richard punching an on-ice official. The suspension sparked a riot by angry Canadiens fans on March 17, 1955, during a game against the Red Wings (see below).

Offseason

Regular season

The Richard Riot

On March 13, 1955, Canadiens star Maurice Richard was involved in a fighting incident in Boston. Boston's Hal Laycoe high-sticked Richard and cut him on the head, momentarily leaving Richard dazed and prone on the ice. Richard then got up off the ice and attacked Laycoe, breaking his stick on Laycoe. While linesman Cliff Thompson restrained Richard, Laycoe got up and punched Richard. Richard broke free and punched Thompson in the face. This was Richard's second incident with an official that season and a league disciplinary hearing was held. NHL president Clarence Campbell (who had previously been criticized publicly by Richard) then suspended Richard for the rest of the season and the playoffs; at the time, this was the longest suspension for an on-ice incident in NHL history. The Bruins' Laycoe received no fine or suspension for his actions. Public outrage from Montreal soon poured in, but Campbell stood firm, and moreover announced that he would be attending the Canadiens' next home game against the Red Wings on March 17.

Midway into the first period, Campbell arrived with his fiancée. Outraged Canadiens fans immediately began pelting them with eggs, vegetables, and various debris, with more being thrown at him each time the Red Wings scored, building up a 4–1 lead on Montreal. The continuous pelting of various objects stopped when a tear gas bomb was set off inside the Forum not far from where Campbell was sitting. The Forum was ordered evacuated and Campbell ruled the game forfeited to the Red Wings. That was the last straw, as a riot ensued outside the Forum, causing $500,000 in damage to the neighbourhood and the Forum itself. Hundreds of stores were looted and vandalized within a 15-block radius of the Forum. Twelve policemen and 25 civilians were injured. The riot continued well into the night, with police arresting people by the truckload. Local radio stations, which carried live coverage of the riot for over seven hours, had to be forced off the air. The riot was eventually over at 3 am, and left Montreal's Rue Ste-Catherine a mess.

Richard's suspension also cost him the Art Ross Trophy, the closest he ever came to winning it. When Richard's teammate Bernie Geoffrion passed him on the last day of the regular season, he was booed by Montreal faithful. Geoffrion, a right winger, was struggling to gain recognition of his considerable talents because the three leading right wingers of the 1950s were Gordie Howe of the Detroit Red Wings, Andy Bathgate of the New York Rangers, and Richard, Geoffrion's own teammate.

The Canadiens lost the Cup Final to Detroit in seven games, but would win the Cup in the year after, fittingly over the Red Wings — and the next four years in a row after that. Richard retired in 1960 after the Canadiens' fifth straight Stanley Cup, a record that still stands.

Final standings

Record vs. opponents

Schedule and results

‡ Forfeited to Detroit after one period. Goals and assists for the game still counted as official.

Playoffs
Montreal defeated the Boston Bruins 4–1 to reach the finals.

Stanley Cup Final

Detroit Red Wings vs. Montreal Canadiens

Detroit wins best-of-seven series 4 games to 3.

Player statistics

Regular season
Scoring

Goaltending

Playoffs
Scoring

Goaltending

Awards and records
 Art Ross Trophy: Bernie Geoffrion
 James Norris Memorial Trophy: Doug Harvey
 Jean Beliveau, Centre, NHL First Team All-Star 
 Bernie Geoffrion, Right Wing, NHL Second Team All-Star
 Doug Harvey, Defence, NHL First Team All-Star
 Ken Mosdell, Centre, NHL Second Team All-Star
 Maurice Richard, Right Wing, NHL First Team All-Star

Transactions

See also
 1954–55 NHL season

References
Canadiens on Hockey Database

 
Montreal Canadiens seasons
Mon
Mon